Julia Demina (born February 3, 1969) is a Russian chess player.  She has won the Women's Russian Chess Championship twice, the Soviet championship once before, and competed for the Women's World Chess Championship several times.  Demina earned the title of Woman Grandmaster in 1991.

References

External links 
 
 chess games entry

Living people
1969 births
Russian female chess players
Chess woman grandmasters